is a passenger railway station  located in Minami-ku, Yokohama, Kanagawa Prefecture, Japan, operated by the private railway company operated by the Keikyū.

Lines
Gumyōji Station is served by the Keikyū Main Line and is located 29.1 kilometers from the terminus of the line at Shinagawa  Station in Tokyo.

Station layout
The station consists of two elevated opposed side platforms with the station building located underneath.

Platforms

History
Gumyōji Station was opened on April 1, 1930 as a station on the Shōnan Electric Railway, which merged with the Keihin Electric Railway on November 1, 1941.  The platforms were lengthened to accommodate 6-car long trains in 1969, and a new elevated station building was completed in 1984. The platforms were further lengthened to accommodate 8-car long trains in December 1987.

Keikyū introduced station numbering to its stations on 21 October 2010; Gumyōji Station was assigned station number KK43.

Passenger statistics
In fiscal 2019, the station was used by an average of 29,663 passengers daily. 

The passenger figures for previous years are as shown below.

Surrounding area
 Gumyoji Park
Yokohama City Minami Library
Yokohama City Minami Junior High School
Yokohama Gumyoji Post Office
Yokohama City Ooka District Center
Yokohama City Minami Sports Center

See also
 List of railway stations in Japan

References

External links

 

Railway stations in Kanagawa Prefecture
Railway stations in Japan opened in 1930
Keikyū Main Line
Railway stations in Yokohama